Omar Camporese (born 8 May 1968) is a former professional tennis player from Italy.

Career
Born in Bologna, Camporese turned professional in 1987. He reached his first top-level singles final in 1990 at San Marino, where he lost to Guillermo Pérez Roldán 6–3, 6–3.

In 1991, Camporese won his first tour singles title in Rotterdam, defeating Ivan Lendl in the final 3–6, 7–6, 7–6. At the Australian Open the same year he lost against Boris Becker in a 311 minutes long match. Becker won 7–6, 7–6, 0–6, 4–6, 14–12 which is the fourth longest match in the tournament's history.
1992 saw Camporese win his second tour singles title at Milan, where he beat Goran Ivanišević in the final 3–6, 6–3, 6–4.

Camporese's best performance at a Grand Slam event came at the 1992 Australian Open, where he reached the fourth round before being knocked out by Lendl.

During his career, Camporese won two top-level singles titles and five tour doubles titles. His career high rankings were World No. 18 in singles and World No. 27 in doubles (both in 1992). His career prize-money totalled $1,609,837. Camporese retired from the professional tour in 1998.

Career finals

Singles (2 wins, 1 loss)

Doubles (5 wins, 4 losses)

External links 
 
 
 

1968 births
Living people
Italian male tennis players
Olympic tennis players of Italy
Sportspeople from Bologna
Tennis players at the 1988 Summer Olympics
Tennis players at the 1992 Summer Olympics
Mediterranean Games gold medalists for Italy
Mediterranean Games silver medalists for Italy
Mediterranean Games medalists in tennis
Competitors at the 1987 Mediterranean Games